Aslak Nilsen (8 December 1898 – 26 September 1952) was a Norwegian politician.

He was born in Kragerø to Knut Andreas Nilsen and Karen Thorbjørnsen. He was elected representative to the Storting for the periods 1934–1936 and 1937–1945, for the Labour Party.

References

1898 births
1952 deaths
People from Kragerø
Labour Party (Norway) politicians
Members of the Storting